Saija Varjus (born 30 January 1965 in Parkano) is a Finnish popular musician. She was chosen the "Tango Queen" 1996 in the Tangomarkkinat festival in Seinäjoki. This was her second attempt: she had competed in 1993 but only reached as far as the semifinal.

Biography 
Varjus had previously worked as a teacher. Her most famous recordings include "Dam dam da da di dum" (1997), "Vastatuuleen" (1998), "Kuiskaten" (2002) and "Ihana aamu" (2002).

In January 1998, Saija Varjus was diagnosed with multiple sclerosis.

On 13 October 2007, she married the guitarist Petri Hämäläinen.

Discography 
 Saija Varjus (1997)
 Yambaijaa (1998)
 Tähtiin kirjoitettu (2000)
 Parhaat (2001)
 "Ihana aamu" (2002)
 "Varjus" (2007)

Awards
 Tango Queen (1996)

References

Sources
 Marja Nyman, Tangokuninkaalliset, Revontuli 2002, 
 Tony Latva and Petri Tuunainen, Iskelmän tähtitaivas, WSOY 2004,

External links
 Tangomarkkinat
 Official fansite

1965 births
Living people
People from Parkano
21st-century Finnish women singers
Finnish tango musicians
20th-century Finnish women singers